Clostridium tyrobutyricum is a rod-shaped, Gram-positive bacterium that grows under anaerobic conditions and produces butyric acid, acetic acid and hydrogen gas as the major fermentation products from glucose and xylose.

The late-blowing defect in cheese
Clostridium tyrobutyricum spores present in raw milk ferments lactate causing the "late-blowing" defect in high-pH cheeses such as Emmentaler, Gouda or Edammer. Even low spore densities of this anaerobe in milk used for cheese production can bring about this phenomenon, if the growth conditions are suitable.
This defect is characterized by eyes, slits, and cracks caused by the production of the gas bubbles as well as abnormal cheese flavor from the Butyric acid. This defect can create considerable loss of product.

References

External links
 Clostridium tyrobutyricum ATCC 25755
 Type strain of Clostridium tyrobutyricum at BacDive -  the Bacterial Diversity Metadatabase

Gram-positive bacteria
tyrobutyricum
Bacteria described in 1935